Vlatka is a feminine given name of South Slavic origin. It may refer to:

Vlatka Pokos
Vlatka Oršanić

References

Feminine given names
Slavic feminine given names
Croatian feminine given names
Serbian feminine given names